Integrated nested Laplace approximations (INLA) is a method for approximate Bayesian inference based on Laplace's method. It is designed for a class of models called latent Gaussian models (LGMs), for which it can be a fast and accurate alternative for Markov chain Monte Carlo methods to compute posterior marginal distributions. Due to its relative speed even with large data sets for certain problems and models, INLA has been a popular inference method in applied statistics, in particular spatial statistics, ecology, and epidemiology. It is also possible to combine INLA with a finite element method solution of a stochastic partial differential equation to study e.g. spatial point processes and species distribution models. The INLA method is implemented in the R-INLA R package.

Latent Gaussian models 
Let  denote the response variable (that is, the observations) which belongs to an exponential family, with the mean  (of ) being linked to a linear predictor  via an appropriate link function. The linear predictor can take the form of a (Bayesian) additive model. All latent effects (the linear predictor, the intercept, coefficients of possible covariates, and so on) are collectively denoted by the vector .

The observations are assumed to be conditionally independent given  and :

For the model to be a latent Gaussian model, it is assumed that  is a Gaussian Markov Random Field (GMRF) (that is, a multivariate Gaussian with additional conditional independence properties) with probability density 

The precision matrix is sparse due to the GMRF assumption. The prior distribution  for the hyperparameters need not be Gaussian. However, the number of hyperparameters, is assumed to be small (say, less than 15).

Approximate Bayesian inference with INLA 
Applying Bayes' theorem

Obtaining the exact posterior is generally a very difficult problem. In INLA, the main aim is to approximate the posterior marginals

where .

A key idea of INLA is to construct nested approximations given by

where  is an approximated posterior density.

To get the approximate distribution , one can use the relation

as the starting point. Then  is obtained at a specific value of the hyperparameters  with Laplace's approximation

The mode can be found numerically for example with the Newton-Raphson method. 

Obtaining the approximate distribution  is more involved, and the INLA method provides three options for this: Gaussian approximation, Laplace approximation, or the simplified Laplace approximation. For the numerical integration to obtain , also three options are available: grid search, central composite design, or empirical Bayes.

References

Further reading 
 

Computational statistics
Bayesian inference